David Jenkins Ward (September 17, 1871 – February 18, 1961), a Democrat, was a U.S. Congressman.

Ward was born in Salisbury, Maryland, and attended the public schools.  He served as a farmer, lumberjack, merchant, and in the real estate business.  Ward served as a member of the Maryland House of Delegates from 1915 to 1917, and as chair of the Democratic state central committee of Wicomico County from 1918 to 1926.  He served as a member of the Maryland Senate from 1926 to 1934 and 1938 to 1939.

Ward was elected in a special election to fill the vacancy caused by the resignation of T. Alan Goldsborough, and represented the 1st Congressional district of Maryland from June 8, 1939, to January 3, 1945.  He was an unsuccessful candidate for renomination in 1944.  He died in Salisbury, and is interred in Parsons Cemetery.

References

1871 births
1961 deaths
Democratic Party Maryland state senators
Democratic Party members of the Maryland House of Delegates
Democratic Party members of the United States House of Representatives from Maryland